Lackovce is a village and municipality in Slovakia.

Location 
Lackovce is situated at the confluence of the Laborec and a side stream.

History 
The first mention of the village was in 1451. Until the Treaty of Trianon the community belonged to the Kingdom of Hungary, to Zemplén, a district of Humenné, later to Czechoslovakia, during World War II and from 1993 to Slovakia.

References

External links
 

Villages and municipalities in Humenné District